The Bus Regulatory Reform Act of 1982 was signed into law by President Ronald Reagan on September 20, 1982. The law contained provisions considered "deregulatory" of the bus industry, representing the largest legislation of regulatory reform since 1935.

On signing the bill into law, Reagan stated:

Law
The bill included reducing restrictions on bus lines to add or remove stops, and increasing ease of entry of entrepreneurs into the bus service market. As such, authority could be granted to any "fit, willing, and able" carrier unless a protestant could show the new authority was contrary to public interest. The bill provided the Interstate Commerce Commission could investigate or suspend rates considered discriminatory or predatory. It could also overrule state regulatory authorities on intrastate "rate and exit issues" if state rulings caused "undue burdens" on interstate commerce.

Following the enactment of the new law, the Interstate Commerce Commission received over 2000 applications to operate new bus services. However, the rate of service loss was not substantially different from that observed prior to passage.

Supporters of the Act consider it "beneficial in improving the economic efficiency of carriers", while "some minor reservations" exist "regarding its adverse effects on smaller towns and rural areas".
Those most affected by the bill were union bus drivers as the deregulation of the industry allowed for new, non-union workers to flood the market and decrease wages across the board, leading in 1983 to the Greyhound Bus Line Strikes which lasted several weeks nationally.

References

Bibliography
William E. Thoms - Unleashing the Greyhounds - The Bus Regulatory Reform Act of 1982, Campbell Law Review. Volume 6, Issue 1, article 4.

Acts of the 97th United States Congress